Idol stjörnuleit (season 1) was the first season of Idol stjörnuleit, 
Iceland's version of the British reality series Pop Idol. Kalli Bjarni was the winner, with Jón Sigurðsson and Anna Katrín Guðbrandsdóttir as runners-up.

Finals

Finalists
(ages stated at time of contest)

Live show details

Heat 1 (24 October 2003)

Heat 2 (31 October 2003)

Heat 3 (7 November 2003)

Heat 4 (14 November 2003)

Live Show 1 (5 December 2003)
Theme: Icelandic Songs

Live Show 2 (12 December 2003)
Theme: Disco Hits

Live Show 3 (19 December 2003)
Theme: Stuðmenn Songs

Live Show 4 (2 January 2004)
Theme: Film Hits

Live Show 5: Semi-final (9 January 2004)
Theme: Number 1 Hits

Live final (16 January 2004)

External links
Official Website via Web Archive

References

Idol stjörnuleit
2003 Icelandic television seasons
2004 Icelandic television seasons